Heaven Can Wait is the third EP by OPM. It was released for digital download on September 22, 2012. It features 5 re-recorded songs and was released to celebrate 13 years since the band's formation.

Track listing
"Run Away" - 3:42
"Heaven Is a Halfpipe" - 4:22
"El Capitan" - 3:29
"Stash Up" - 3:15
"Brighter Side" - 3:10

Band Line-up
John E. Necro - Lead vocals
Geoff Turney - Guitar
Jonathan Williams - Keys
Matt Rowe - Bass
Shane Mayo - Drums

References

2012 EPs
OPM (band) albums